Géza of Hungary may refer to:
 Géza, Grand Prince of the Hungarians
 Géza I of Hungary, King of Hungary 
 Géza II of Hungary, King of Hungary
 Géza, son of Géza II of Hungary, Hungarian royal prince
 Archduke Géza of Austria, Prince Royal of Hungary